Tinirau Arona (born 8 May 1989) is a former Cook Islands international rugby league footballer who last played as a  and  for Wakefield Trinity in the Super League. 

He previously played for the Sydney Roosters and the Cronulla-Sutherland Sharks in the NRL.

Background
Arona was born in Dunedin, New Zealand. He is of Cook Islands descent and moved to Sydney, New South Wales, Australia as an 11-year-old. Arona is cousins with Penrith Panthers and Cook Islands representative player Tupou Sopoaga.

He played his junior rugby league for the St Clair Comets, before being signed by the Penrith Panthers.

Playing career
On 4 October 2006, Arona made his international début for the Cook Islands as a 17-year-old, playing off the interchange bench and scored the Cook Islands only try in the 46-6 loss to the Samoa. In October 2009, Arona played 2 matches for the Cook Islands in the Pacific Cup. Arona played in the Penrith Panthers NYC team in 2008-2009 before moving on to play for the Sydney Roosters NSW Cup team the Newtown Jets in 2010 where Arona was awarded the club's best and fairest and best forward. Earning himself a contract with the Sydney Roosters.

Sydney Roosters

2011
In Round 4 of the 2011 NRL season, Arona made his NRL début for the Sydney Roosters, playing off the interchange bench in the Roosters 24-6 victory over the Wests Tigers at SFS. Arona finished his début year in the NRL with him playing in 13 matches for the Sydney Roosters in the 2011 NRL season. On 3 November 2011 The annual RLIF Awards dinner was held at the Tower of London and Arona was named Cook Islands' player of the year.

2012
In Round 9 against the Newcastle Knights at SFS, Arona scored his first NRL career try in the Roosters 24-6 win. Arona finished the 2012 NRL season with him playing in 20 matches and scoring 3 tries (12p) for the Sydney Roosters.

2013
In July 2013, Arona represented the NSW Residents side. Arona finished the 2013 NRL season with him playing in 3 matches for the Sydney Roosters. Arona was part of the Cook Islands national rugby league team that participated in the 2013 Rugby League World Cup playing at lock in all 3 matches for the Cook Islands. On 6 December 2013, Arona signed with the Cronulla-Sutherland Sharks after getting released from his contract with the Sydney Roosters.

Cronulla-Sutherland Sharks

2014
In round 1 of the 2014 NRL season, Arona made his National Rugby League Premiership début for the Cronulla-Sutherland Sharks, scoring a try in Cronulla's 18-12 loss to the Gold Coast Titans at Remondis Stadium. Arona finished his first year with the Cronulla-Sutherland Sharks in the 2014 NRL season with him playing in 21 matches and scoring 3 tries (12p).  The club endured one of their toughest ever seasons in 2014 finishing with the wooden spoon.

Wakefield Trinity
On 5 November 2015, Arona signed a one-year contract with Super League side Wakefield Trinity starting in 2016.
In 2018, he signed a contract extension to remain at Wakefield until the end of the 2019 Super League season.
In 2019, he signed a three-year contract extension to remain at Wakefield until the end of the 2022 season.
On 24 August 2022, Arona announced he would depart Wakefield Trinity at the end of the season.

International career
In Arona's final professional game, he scored a try and kicked the last conversion of the match in the Cook Islands 92-10 loss against Tonga at the Riverside Stadium. The Cook Islands finished their 2021 Rugby League World Cup campaign in third place and were eliminated.

References

External links
Wakefield Trinity profile
Cronulla-Sutherland Sharks profile
Newtown Jets profile
SL profile

1989 births
Living people
Cook Island sportspeople
Cook Islands national rugby league team players
Cronulla-Sutherland Sharks players
Expatriate rugby league players in Australia
New Zealand expatriate rugby league players
New Zealand expatriate sportspeople in Australia
New Zealand expatriate sportspeople in England
New Zealand sportspeople of Cook Island descent
New Zealand rugby league players
Newtown Jets NSW Cup players
Rugby league locks
Rugby league players from Dunedin
Rugby league props
Rugby league second-rows
Sydney Roosters players
Wakefield Trinity players